Edward Abeles (November 4, 1869 – July 10, 1919) was an American actor. He appeared in eight films between 1914 and 1918. Before working for Famous Players-Lasky, of which he was one of the founding members, he had a lengthy stage career.

Abeles was a lawyer and worked as a reporter before he became an actor. After debuting in the play Alabama as a "tiny southern boy", his early experiences in acting included appearing in several musical productions as "Anna Held's juvenile man".

He starred in the 1906 Broadway hit Brewster's Millions. He later starred in the first film version of the play, directed by Cecil B. DeMille.

Abeles was born in St. Louis, Missouri. On July 10, 1919, he died of pneumonia at Dr. MacWilliam's Private Sanatarium in New York City, New York, aged 49.

Selected filmography
Brewster's Millions (1914)
The Making of Bobby Burnit (1914)
The Lone Wolf (1917)
 Opportunity (1918)

References

External links

Edward Abeles portrait at New York Public Library (Billy Rose Collection)

1869 births
1919 deaths
American male silent film actors
Male actors from St. Louis
American male stage actors
20th-century American male actors
Deaths from pneumonia in New York City